XXXDial is a spyware/dialer application which created a number of problems for UK internet users in December 2004. It changes a victim's point-to-point protocol (PPP) settings so that it automatically tries to reconnect to a premium rate number, as opposed to a user's normal dial-in number.

It has been noted that the dialer does not give any indication to the user that they are using anything different from their standard ISP's number while they are actually being charged a rate up to 200 times their normal dialup rate

The dialer is found "in the wild" on websites and with software that are often adult in nature.

This dialer only appears to affect computers running Microsoft Windows Operating System.

References

Spyware